35027 Port Line was one of a batch of ten SR Merchant Navy class steam locomotives built by the Southern Region of British Railways between 1948 and 1949.

Completed at Eastleigh Works in December 1948, it was named on 24 April 1950 in Southampton Docks. Port Line was shedded at Bournemouth with others of the class such as Canadian Pacific. Along with the rest of the class, Port Line was rebuilt by removal of the air-smoothed casing at Eastleigh in 1957, and this rebuilding made them similar to the BR Standard class engines of the time. Two years later, it pulled the British Royal Train from Windsor to Hamworthy Junction. Last working from Weymouth in 1966, it was withdrawn at the end of steam on the Southern Region in 1967 and sent to Woodham Brothers scrapyard in Barry, South Wales.

Port Line was not as fortunate as 35028 Clan Line, which went straight into preservation. Port Line stayed in the scrapyard until 1982, when it was saved; this was part of a BBC documentary The Train Now Departing.

After restoration, Port Line was based at the Bluebell Railway from 1988 until 2000, last working on the Bluebell in 1996. 35027 moved to the Swanage Railway in early 2000, further boiler work allowing it to operate a limited number of steamings from November 2000 until October 2003, when it was stopped with firebox cracks. Port Line was sold in 2004 to Jeremy Hosking, and moved to Southall. In January 2011, transferred to the Royal Scot Locomotive and General Trust (RSL&GT), Port Line was moved to Ian Riley's workshops at Bury on the East Lancashire Railway for overhaul to mainline standard, using the boiler from 35022 Holland America Line. From 2007 to 2011, 35027's tender had been in use with rebuilt West Country class 34046 Braunton, owned by Hosking. It was until recently in use behind unrebuilt West Country class 34007 Wadebridge.

See also
 Southern Locomotives Ltd

References

Merchant Navy 35027
Locomotives saved from Woodham Brothers scrapyard
Standard gauge steam locomotives of Great Britain
Railway locomotives introduced in 1948